The Bronze Helmet is an annual speedway event held each year organised by the Polish Motor Union (PZM) since 1976.

Previous winners

 (+2017, all three riders finished on 9 points)

References

 
Helmet Bronze